Monica Evans (born 7 June 1940) is an English actress known for her portrayal of Cecily Pigeon in Neil Simon's The Odd Couple. She was in the original Broadway cast for its entire run, then appeared in the film version in 1968, and finally appeared in some episodes of the first season of the television series based on the play, all in the same role, alongside Carole Shelley as her sister Gwendolyn Pigeon. She also provided voices for the two animated films for Walt Disney Productions, such as The Aristocats (1970), as Abigail Gabble (the Goose) (alongside Shelley as Amelia Gabble) and Robin Hood (1973) as Maid Marian, a vixen (again alongside Shelley as her handmaiden, Lady Kluck, a chicken).

Evans trained at the Royal Central School of Speech & Drama in the 1950s and was the stand-in for Joan Plowright in Rhinoceros. She took over the role from Plowright when Plowright's's relationship with Laurence Olivier became public. She was also one of the stars in a soap opera for BBC Television called Compact, set in the office of a magazine, and starred in The Severed Head in the West End. Evans was the maid of honor at Carole Shelley's wedding in 1967.

She lived in the United States for several years. After her return to the UK she married BBC Radio 1 DJ Dave Cash. Her brother-in-law is Charles Hayward, the drummer of This Heat. 

In 2018, she was at the 2018 TCM Classic Film Festival, reuniting with her old friend, Carole Shelley.

TV and filmography

References

External links

1940 births
Living people
People from Camberwell
English film actresses
English voice actresses
English stage actresses
English television actresses
Alumni of RADA
20th-century English actresses